James Hay, Lord Hay and Lord Slains (c.1797 – 16 June 1815) was a British Army officer killed during the Waterloo Campaign.

Biography
James Hay was the son of William Hay, 17th Earl of Erroll and his wife Alicia Eliot (d. 1812).

Hay, an ensign in the 1st Foot Guards, was killed at the Battle of Quatre Bras while serving as aide-de-camp to General Maitland. Had he lived, he would have succeeded his father as Earl of Erroll upon his death in 1819; as it was, his brother William succeeded to the title.

In 1899 Murray's Magazine published some recollections by Georgiana, Dowager Lady De Ros (a daughter of the Duchess of Richmond) about Duchess of Richmond's ball that took place on 15 June 1815. She recalled "I remember being quite provoked with poor Lord Hay, a dashing merry youth, full of military ardour, whom I knew very well for his delight at the idea of going into action, and of all the honours he was to gain; and the first news we had on the 16th was that he and the Duke of Brunswick were killed".

Circa 1890, Hay's remains were moved to the crypt under The British Waterloo Campaign Monument in The Brussels Cemetery at Evere.

Fictional portrayals
In the 1970 film Waterloo, Hay is portrayed by British actor Peter Davies; in contrast with historical events, he is a main character, constantly at Wellington's side on the day of Waterloo. At the Duchess of Richmond's ball, he dances with her daughter Sarah and the two are obviously in love. The Duchess says to Wellington, "Don't let young Hay get killed", and he is surprised to hear that they have been formally engaged.  Later in the film, Hay serves alongside the Duchess' brother, the Duke of Gordon, chieftain of Clan Gordon. Wellington remarks to Hay that he is "a lucky fellow, to see such a sight (the French Army) in your first battle". The fictional Hay's last words are "Think of England, men, think of England!" but these are likely to have been fabricated by the scriptwriters.  He is struck in the head by a bullet and dies instantly.
He is also portrayed in Georgette Heyer's 1937 novel An Infamous Army, which deals with events of Waterloo through the eyes of fictional characters but describing real people and events.

References

General

Georgiana, Dowager Lady De Ros. Personal Recollections of the Duke of Wellington , The Regency Library, Complimentary Issue July 2005. Originally published in Murray's Magazine 1889 Part I. pp. 40,43.

1797 births
1815 deaths
Grenadier Guards officers
British military personnel killed in action in the Napoleonic Wars
British Army personnel of the Napoleonic Wars
British courtesy barons and lords of Parliament
Heirs apparent who never acceded